Jed Eugene Rose, Ph.D. is an American academic professor, inventor and researcher in the field of nicotine and smoking cessation. Rose is presently the President and CEO of the Rose Research Center, LLC in Raleigh, North Carolina. Additionally, he is the Director of the Duke Center for Smoking Cessation at Duke University Medical Center.

Personal life 
Jed Eugene Rose was born on June 8, 1952, in Ohio.

Rose received his undergraduate bachelor's degree at the University of California, Berkeley. He later went on to obtain his Ph.D. at the University of California, San Diego and finished his PostDoctoral work at the University of California, Los Angeles

Inventions and research 
Rose is most known for co-inventing the nicotine skin patch with the late Murray Jarvik, M.D., Ph.D. and K. Daniel Rose in the early 1980s. Rose et al. published the first study of the pharmacokinetics of a transdermal nicotine patch in humans in 1984 and the subsequently filed US Patent 4920989 which was upheld in a priority decision in 1993. This work helped pave the way for the development of commercial nicotine skin patches.

Rose is also responsible for studying agonist-antagonist treatments that provided support for the development varenicline (Chantix).

Also in the 1980s, Rose developed novel methods for reaerosolizing selected constituents of tobacco smoke in cigarette-sized devices, a forerunner of modern e-cigarettes.

His first NIDA-funded grant, “Scaling the Reinforcing Value of Cigarette Smoke” (1981-2000), measured the role of nicotine in tobacco dependence, by selectively varying nicotine concentrations in smoke while holding tar yield constant, using a two-barreled smoke-mixing device. This method was employed in research cited in the 1988 U.S. Surgeon General's Report on nicotine addiction.

Significant contributions to science

Nicotine patch 
Rose initiated the development of the nicotine patch for smoking cessation: In the early 1980s, he led the initial exploration of transdermal nicotine administration for smoking cessation. In a series of studies he and colleagues showed that transdermal nicotine administration reduced craving for cigarettes and that it was efficacious for smoking cessation. Rose experimented on himself, applying nicotine to his skin and measuring his body's physiological responses.

Inspiring the development of Chantix 
Rose aided in the conception of varenicline for smoking cessation: In the 1990s Rose et al. conducted clinical trials of an agonist-antagonist combination treatment, using nicotine (agonist) and mecamylamine (nicotinic antagonist). The combination proved more efficacious than either agent alone. Pfizer pharmaceuticals cited  this work as helping to inspire the development of the partial nicotinic agonist varenicline, which is currently the most effective pharmacologic smoking cessation treatment available.

Sensory factors in tobacco addiction 
Rose demonstrated the role of nicotine and non-nicotine sensory factors in tobacco addiction: In a series of studies, Rose et al. dissociated non-nicotine factors, including sensory cues accompanying cigarette inhalation, from the pharmacologic effects of nicotine. Attenuating these cues, while holding nicotine intake constant, significantly reduced the psychological rewarding and satiating effects of cigarette smoke. Conversely, presenting sensory inhalational cues down-regulated smoking behavior.

First radiotracer nicotine studies 
Rose elucidated the brain pharmacokinetics of inhaled nicotine: Rose et al. conducted the first direct assessment of the rate of brain nicotine uptake during cigarette smoking, using cigarettes spiked with the radiotracer [11C]nicotine and PET scanning to image nicotine in the brain. The results overturned the widely held “puff bolus” hypothesis, which held that the nicotine from each puff of smoke should generate a
spike in brain nicotine uptake within 10 seconds. In fact, the lung serves as a depot for nicotine, releasing the dose over several minutes. This new understanding of brain nicotine pharmacokinetics has implications both for the understanding of mechanisms underlying nicotine addiction as well as development of more effective nicotine replacement strategies.

First adaptive treatment algorithm for smoking cessation 
Rose validated the first adaptive treatment algorithm for smoking cessation: Rose led a series of studies showing that the initial response to pre-cessation administration of nicotine skin patch treatment predicted long-term
abstinence. Subsequently, this response was used to implement adaptive changes in pharmacotherapy for patch non-responders. Rose continues to develop personalized approaches to smoking cessation treatment based on smokers’ characteristics, including level of nicotine dependence, and genomic markers, which he helped to identify in the first genome-wide association studies of smoking cessation treatment outcome.

Selected publications

Rose JE.   Transdermal nicotine as a strategy for nicotine replacement.  In: The Pharmacologic Treatment of Tobacco Dependence: Proceedings of the World Congress, November 4–5, 1985, edited by JK Ockene.  Cambridge, MA: Institute for the Study of Smoking Behavior and Policy, pp. 158–166, 1986.

References

External links 
 Duke Faculty Website
 The Rose Research Center, LLC
 Nicotine Skin Patch Patent US4920989
 Patents invented and co-invented by Jed Rose
 Dr. Rose Publications

University of California, Berkeley alumni
University of California, San Diego alumni
University of California, Los Angeles alumni
Living people
1952 births
American scientists